Vivir (English: Live) is the second Spanish studio album recorded by Spanish singer-songwriter Enrique Iglesias. It was released by Fonovisa on 21 January 1997 (see 1997 in music). The album includes three number-one singles on the Billboard Hot Latin Tracks charts in United States: "Enamorado Por Primera Vez", "Sólo En Ti" and "Miente". In the United States, it was platinum on 6 May 1997. This album received a nomination for Grammy Award for Best Latin Pop Album at the 40th Annual Grammy Awards, on 25 February 1998, losing to Romances by Luis Miguel.  The album received a Premio Lo Nuestro award for "Pop Album of the Year" at the 9th Lo Nuestro Awards. To the date the record has sold a million copies in U.S and over 5 million copies worldwide.

Commercial performance

The album debuted in the Billboard Top Latin Albums chart at number 1 in the week of 15 February 1997, dethroning his own father Julio Iglesias with the album Tango, and spent eight weeks at pole position, until Selena's Dreaming of You took the number-one spot for two weeks. Enrique Iglesias with his debut album replaced Selena's album at number-one the year before. In the week of 26 April 1997 Vivir returned to the top spot for another three weeks at the summit. The album spent 15 non-consecutive weeks at pole position, it also spent 36 weeks inside the Top Ten and 69 weeks in the chart, selling 5 million copies worldwide. The album's first three singles achieved 26 weeks at the top of the "Hot Latin Tracks" of Billboard in 1997, an astonishing feat that hasn't been matched yet by any other artist.

Track listing

Personnel

Christina Abaroa - producer, production coordination
Jeff DeMorris - assistant engineer, mixing assistant
Mike Dy - assistant engineer, mixing assistant
Cristin Allen Goetz - production coordination
Brad Kinnek - backing vocals, engineer, assistant engineer, mixing assistant
Chris Lord-Alge - mixing
Michael Parnin - assistant engineer, mixing assistant
Tony DeFranco - mixing coordinator
Antonio Olariaga - transfers, digital transfers
Chein García-Alonso - adaptation
Doug Sax - mastering
Andrew Sheeps - digital editing
Miguel Ángel Cuberto - transfers
Fernando Martínez - management
Roberto Morales - advisor, music assistant
Steven Lippman - photography
Erin Flanagan - stylist
Manolo Ruiz - stylist
John Coulter - design
Rafael Pérez-Botija - piano, arranger, keyboards, producer
Enrique Iglesias - vocals, backing vocals
Luis Conte -  percussion
Gregg Bissonette - drums
Neal Avron - engineer, drums
Bob Painter - keyboards, programming, vocals, engineer
Mitchel Forman - piano
Gary Grant - trumpet
Jerry Hey - trumpet
Paulinho Da Costa - percussion
Michael Landau - guitar
Neil Stubenhaus - bass
Arturo Velasco - trombone
Dan Higgins - saxophone
Leland Sklar - bass
Billy Preston - Hammond organ
Bill Reichenbach Jr. - trombone
Charmain Renata - Hubbard Vocals, Choir, Chorus
Ron Marshall - vocals, choir, chorus
Sarah Anindo Marshall - vocals, choir master
Steve Sykes - guitar, backing vocals, engineer
Ayo Adeyemi - vocals, choir, chorus
Malang Bayo - vocals, choir, chorus
Patricio Castillo - backing vocals
María Del Rey - backing vocals, contractor
Dennis Hetzendorfer - engineer
Carlos Murguía - backing vocals
Dan Navarro - backing vocals
Kenny O'Brien - backing vocals
Terry Wood - backing vocals
Gisa Vatcky - backing vocals
Elhadj Malick Sow - vocals, choir, chorus
Brad Kinney - backing vocals
Eric Ratz - vocals, engineer

Charts

Certifications and sales

See also
1997 in Latin music
List of number-one Billboard Top Latin Albums from the 1990s
 List of best-selling Latin albums

References

1997 albums
Enrique Iglesias albums
Fonovisa Records albums
Spanish-language albums